Early Olympic Games allowed for individuals in a team to be from different nations.  The International Olympic Committee (IOC) now groups their results together under the mixed team designation (IOC code ZZX).  During the 1900 Summer Olympics, several teams comprising international members won 19 medals in 12 different events.

Medalists

Alphabetical list of all medallists from mixed teams

Medalists of mixed teams with two medals in 1900 summer Olympics 
Six medalists of mixed teams won two medals as part of mixed teams in the 1900 Summer Olympics. Three of them were rugby players who also won medals in tug of war. Three were sailors who won both races in an event staged twice.

Notes

References
International Olympic Committee 1900 Paris website
IOC results database

Nations at the 1900 Summer Olympics
1900